Serhat Köksal (born 18 February 1990) is a Dutch-born Turkish professional footballer who currently plays as a midfielder for DHC Delft.

Köksal came from ADO Den Haag's own youth squad and won his first professional contract for the 2010–11 season.

External links
 Voetbal International

1990 births
Living people
Dutch people of Turkish descent
Eredivisie players
Eerste Divisie players
ADO Den Haag players
FC Dordrecht players
Dutch footballers
Turkish footballers
Footballers from The Hague

Association football midfielders